is a museum in Arashiyama, Kyoto, Japan, centered on the Ogura Hyakunin Isshu anthology of waka poems compiled by Fujiwara no Teika in the 13th century. The museum was founded by former Nintendo president Hiroshi Yamauchi, who invested more than $20 million in the facility. Shigureden's Autumn Shower Palace hall was designed by Nintendo game producer Shigeru Miyamoto.

The museum opened its doors on January 27, 2006, featuring an interactive exhibition in its park with poetry-related karuta (like the Uta-garuta), and animated floors, navigated through the use of special Nintendo DS consoles. The museum closed down for renovations on April 1, 2011, and re-opened on March 17, 2012. It was closed for further renovations on March 21, 2017. It then reopened on November 1, 2018 as the Saga Arashiyama Museum of Arts & Culture (SAMAC).

References

External links
Official website (English)
Official website (Japanese)

Nintendo
Buildings and structures in Kyoto
Museums in Kyoto
Museums established in 2006
Tourist attractions in Kyoto Prefecture
2006 establishments in Japan